"Fallin' for You for Years" is a song written by Mike Reid and Troy Seals, and recorded by American country music artist Conway Twitty.  It was released in October 1986 as the second single and title track from the album Fallin' for You for Years.  The song reached #2 on the Billboard Hot Country Singles & Tracks chart.

"... Years" was Twitty's final single for Warner Bros. Records, before returning to his longtime label, MCA Records (where he had recorded between 1965 and 1981). It was there that he released the follow-up single, "Julia," and every other single release during the rest of his lifetime.

Charts

Weekly charts

Year-end charts

References

1987 singles
1986 songs
Conway Twitty songs
Songs written by Mike Reid (singer)
Songs written by Troy Seals
Warner Records singles